Wambaugh is a surname. Notable people with the surname include:

Eugene Wambaugh (1856–1940), American legal scholar
Joseph Wambaugh (born 1937), American writer
Sarah Wambaugh (1882–1955), American political scientist, daughter of Eugene